This is a list of tennis players who have represented the Israel Fed Cup team in an official Fed Cup match. Israel have taken part in the competition since 1972.

Players

References

External links
Israel Tennis Association

Tennis in Israel
Lists of Billie Jean King Cup tennis players